Pinehurst Race Track is a historic horse racing track and national historic district located at Pinehurst in Moore County, North Carolina, USA. The district encompasses 10 contributing buildings, 8 contributing sites, and 1 contributing structure on a complex of barns, stables and other horse-related buildings and paddocks arranged around two oval-shaped race tracks. The oval-shaped race tracks are believed to have been laid out by 1915 as part of the Pinehurst Race Track established by Leonard Tufts. The Amphidrome is a large agricultural exhibition hall built about 1917. It is a 2 1/2-story, gable-roofed building with stuccoed exterior walls and massive timber roof trusses in the Mission Revival style. Other contributing resources include six paddocks (c. 1916-1920), six barns (c. 1910), harness shop (1930), farrier shop (c. 1910), clubhouse (c. 1916), the network of lanes and driveways (c. 1910), and fences (c. 1910). Pinehurst Race Track is the site of the oldest surviving early-20th century fair exhibition hall in the state.

It was added to the National Register of Historic Places in 1992.

References

Horse racing in the United States
Sports venues on the National Register of Historic Places in North Carolina
Historic districts on the National Register of Historic Places in North Carolina
Mission Revival architecture in North Carolina
Sports venues completed in 1915
Buildings and structures in Moore County, North Carolina
National Register of Historic Places in Moore County, North Carolina
1915 establishments in North Carolina